The participation of Wales in Eurovision Choir began in Riga, Latvia, at the Eurovision Choir of the Year 2017. Sianel Pedwar Cymru (S4C) a member organisation of the European Broadcasting Union (EBU) are responsible for the selection process of their participants, for their debut in 2017. The first representative to participate for the nation at the 2017 edition were selected on 9 April 2017 during a national final show entitled Côr Cymru. This was the second time in any of the Eurovision Network events that the United Kingdom has not participated as a unified state after Jeux Sans Frontières in 1994.

Origins of the event
The Eurovision Choir of the Year is organised by the EBU, and the latest event to be launched since the Eurovision Magic Circus Show. The event consists of non-professional choirs who are members of the EBU, with the inaugural contest held on 22 July 2017, hosted by the Latvian broadcaster Latvijas Televīzija (LTV).

History
On 3 April 2017, the Welsh national broadcaster, Sianel Pedwar Cymru (S4C), announced that they would be making their Choir of the Year debut at the 2017 edition in Riga, Latvia on 22 July 2017. This was the first time that the United Kingdom did not participate as a unified state in any of the Eurovision Family of Events. The first choir was selected through a national selection show entitled Côr Cymru, held on 9 April 2017 at the Aberystwyth Arts Centre, in Aberystwyth, Wales.

Participation overview 
Table key

Broadcasts

Commentators
The contests are broadcast online worldwide through the official Eurovision Choir of the Year website eurovisionchoir.tv and YouTube. The Welsh broadcaster, S4C, will send their own commentator to each contest in order to provide commentary in Welsh.

See also
 Wales in the Eurovision Song Contest
 Wales in the Junior Eurovision Song Contest
 United Kingdom in the Eurovision Song Contest – Singing contest in which Wales competes as part of the UK.
 United Kingdom in the Eurovision Song Contest § Separate entrants
 United Kingdom in the Eurovision Dance Contest – Dancing contest in which Wales competed as part of the UK
 United Kingdom in the Eurovision Young Dancers – A competition organised by the EBU for dancers aged between 16 and 21, in which Wales competed as part of the UK.
 United Kingdom in the Eurovision Young Musicians – A competition organised by the EBU for musicians aged up to 18, in which Wales competed as part of the UK.
 United Kingdom in the Junior Eurovision Song Contest – Singing contest for children aged between 9 and 14, in which Wales previously competed as part of the UK.

References

External links
 

Wales
Welsh music
Wales in the Eurovision Song Contest